Lưu Trọng Lư (19 June 1912 – 10 August 1991)  is a Vietnamese poet, writer, play writer. He was born in 1912 at Cao Lao Hạ village, Bố Trạch District, Quảng Bình Province, North Central Coast, Vietnam. He attended Quốc học Huế school, then moved to Hanoi to work as a writer and journalist. He wrote many famous poems. He was one of the founders of the New Poetry Movement (Phong trào Thơ mới) in Vietnam.

People from Quảng Bình province
1912 births
1991 deaths
Vietnamese male poets
20th-century Vietnamese poets
20th-century male writers